A festy cock (alternatively  or fitless cock) is a Scottish alternative to the pancake, fired in a kiln to mark Shrove Tuesday. It is made from fine-ground oatmeal mixed with a small amount of water, rolled, flattened and baked

Notes

References
 
 

British puddings